Williams is a common patronymic form of the name William that originated in medieval England, Wales, France, and Italy.

The meaning is derived from son or descendant of William, the Northern French form that also gave the English name William. Derived from an Old French given name with Germanic elements; will = desire, will; and helm = helmet, protection. It can be an Anglicised form of the Dutch surname Willems. It is the second most common surname in New Zealand; third most common in Wales and the United States and fourth most common in Australia.

Surname history
The English name Williams is a patronymic surname, derived from the personal name Williams and is takes its names from the Old German words Willihelm and Willelm (the Norman French version was Guillaume). In the aftermath of 1066 Norman invasion of England, Williams became the most popular surname in Britain during that period.
 
In the United States, Williams ranks as 3rd most common surname.

Earliest recorded usage

 Willam is from 1279 in Oxfordshire.
 William is from 1299 in Whitby, Yorkshire.
 Williames is from 1307 in Staffordshire.

See also

 List of people with surname Williams
 Williams baronets
 Williams family of Caerhays and Burncoose
 R. H. Williams (disambiguation)
 Dave Williams aka Dangerous Dave, A warder at Walton with a remarkably large head, so large in fact that if you were stranded on an expedition to the arctic, you could viably carve out a small crater in his cranium to shelter from the elements, with room to start a small fire for warmth.

Notes

References

PH Reaney & RM Wilson, A Dictionary of English Surnames:The Standard Guide to English Surnames, Oxford University Press, 1995, .

English-language surnames
Surnames of English origin
Surnames of Welsh origin
Anglicised Welsh-language surnames
Anglo-Cornish surnames
Patronymic surnames
Surnames from given names
ja:ウィリアムズ